Viscount Thurso, of Ulbster in the County of Caithness, is a title in the Peerage of the United Kingdom. It was created on 11 June 1952 for the Scottish Liberal politician and former Secretary of State for Air, Sir Archibald Sinclair, 4th Baronet. His son, the second Viscount, served as Lord Lieutenant of Caithness from 1973 to 1995.

 the titles are held by the latter's son, the third Viscount, who succeeded in 1995. Known as John Thurso, he is a Liberal Democrat politician. Thurso lost his seat in the House of Lords after the passing of the House of Lords Act 1999, but was elected to the House of Commons in 2001, thereby becoming the first hereditary peer of the United Kingdom allowed to sit in the Commons without first disclaiming his title; he held his seat until his defeat in the 2015 general election. On 19 April 2016, he re-entered the Lords following his election by the remaining Liberal Democrat hereditary peers after the death of Lord Avebury. The third Viscount also became Lord Lieutenant of Caithness in 2017.

The Sinclair baronetcy, of Ulbster in the County of Caithness, was created in the Baronetage of Great Britain in 14 February 1786 for the first Viscount's great-great-grandfather, the Scottish politician and writer John Sinclair. Both his son, the second Baronet, and grandson, the third Baronet, represented Caithness in the House of Commons. The latter was the grandfather of the fourth Baronet, who was elevated to the peerage as Viscount Thurso in 1952.

The family seats are Orchard Cottage, near Champneys, Hertfordshire, and Thurso Castle in the Scottish Highlands.

Sinclair baronets, of Ulbster (1786)
Sir John Sinclair, 1st Baronet (1754–1835)
Sir George Sinclair, 2nd Baronet (1790–1868)
Sir John George Tollemache Sinclair, 3rd Baronet (1824–1912)
Clarence Granville Sinclair (1858–1895)
Sir Archibald Henry MacDonald Sinclair, 4th Baronet (1890–1970) (created Viscount Thurso in 1952)

Viscounts Thurso (1952)
Archibald Henry Macdonald Sinclair, 1st Viscount Thurso (1890–1970)
Robin Macdonald Sinclair, 2nd Viscount Thurso (1922–1995)
John Archibald Sinclair, 3rd Viscount Thurso (born 1953)

The heir apparent is the present holder's son, the Hon. James Alexander Robin Sinclair (born 1984).

Male-line family tree

Line of succession

 Rt. Hon. Sir John Sinclair, 1st Baronet (1754–1835)
 Sir George Sinclair, 2nd Baronet (1790–1868)
 Sir John George Tollemache Sinclair, 3rd Baronet (1824–1912)
 Lt Col. Clarence Granville Sinclair (1858–1895)
  Archibald Henry Macdonald Sinclair, 1st Viscount Thurso (1890–1970)
  Robin Macdonald Sinclair, 2nd Viscount Thurso (1922–1995)
  John Archibald Sinclair, 3rd Viscount Thurso (born 1953)
 (1) Hon. James Alexander Robin Sinclair (born 1984)
 (2) Hon. George Henry MacDonald Sinclair (born 1989)
 (3) Hon. Patrick James Sinclair (born 1954)
 (4) Jody Peter Fergus North Sinclair (born 1975)
 (5) Luke Robin Sinclair (born 1979)
 Rev. William Sinclair (1804–1878)
 Ven. John Stewart Sinclair (1853–1919)
 Sir John Alexander Sinclair (1897–1977)
 (6) Ian Alexander Sinclair (born 1938)
 (7) Andrew George Sinclair (born 1970)
 (8) John Charles Sinclair (born 1972)
 (9) Roderick John Sinclair (born 1944)
 (10) James Alexander Sinclair (born 1984)

Only those in positions (1) to (5) are in remainder to the viscountcy. Those in positions (6) to (10) are in remainder to the baronetcy only.

See also
Veronica Linklater, Baroness Linklater of Butterstone

Notes

References
Kidd, Charles, Williamson, David (editors). Debrett's Peerage and Baronetage (1990 edition). New York: St Martin's Press, 1990,

External links

www.debretts.co.uk

Viscountcies in the Peerage of the United Kingdom
Noble titles created in 1952
Noble titles created for UK MPs